Boston Magazine (1783–1786) was produced in Boston, Massachusetts, in the 1780s. It originated from the efforts of "a society for compiling a magazine in the town of Boston;" the society consisted of John Eliot, James Freeman, George R. Minot, Aaron Dexter, John Clarke, John Bradford, Benjamin Lincoln, Christopher Gore, and others. Publishers included John Norman, James White, Edmund Freeman, and Joseph Greenleaf. "An interesting feature of The Boston Magazine was the printing of a Geographical Gazetteer of Massachusetts, which came out as a serial number at the end of certain issues. ... In this supplement an account of twenty-one towns in Suffolk County is given." "The magazine ceased publication with Volume IV for October 1786."

References

Further reading

External links

 . (Frontispiece portrait of John Adams)
 .  (Portrait of Samuel Cooper (clergyman))
 

18th century in Boston
1780s in the United States
Cultural history of Boston
Cultural magazines published in the United States
Defunct magazines published in the United States
Magazines established in 1783
Magazines disestablished in 1786
Magazines published in Boston